Saravana Sakthi is an Indian actor and director who works in Tamil-language films. He has acted in more than twenty-five films.

Career 
Saravana Sakthi began his career as an assistant director under R.Aakash before working on the directorial ventures Dhandayuthapani (2007) and Nayagan (2008). He later became an actor and garnered recognition for his role in Kutti Puli (2013), which enables him to feature in several other films. He worked as the screenplay writer for Soorakaathu (2017) in addition to portraying the antagonist. He returned to direction with Billa Pandi (2019).

Filmography 
As director
Dhandayuthapani (2007)
Nayagan  (2008)
Billa Pandi (2018)

As actor

Kodiveeran (2017)
Sandakozhi 2 (2018)
Kanne Kalaimaane (2019)
Devarattam (2019)
Miga Miga Avasaram
Adutha Saattai (2019)
Utraan (2020)
Walter (2020)
Cocktail (2020)
Danny (2020)
Ka Pae Ranasingam (2020)
Irandam Kuththu (2020)
 Eeswaran (2021)
Ganesapuram (2021)
IPC 376 (2021)
 Raajavamsam (2021)
 Maamanithan (2022)
 Kolathuran (2022)

References

External links 

21st-century Indian male actors
Indian male comedians
Living people
Male actors in Tamil cinema
Tamil comedians
Tamil film directors
Tamil male actors
Year of birth missing (living people)